Wayne Brown (born 21 October 1969) is an English former professional snooker player having played on the World Snooker Tour between 1994 and 2005. He later won the English Seniors national title in 2019.

Career

Brown beat Graeme Dott 7-3 to win the final of the 1994 Pontins Open having lost his previous final in the tournament against Mike Hallett
in 1991.

Brown was a snooker professional on the World Snooker Tour between 1994 and 2005 and reached a career high world ranking of 69. He won matches against players such as Steve Davis and Jimmy White in his career. He made a high-break of 145 in 1999 at the Benson & Hedges Championship against Joe Perry.

In 2019, as an amateur, Brown won the English Seniors Championship beating Stuart Watson 6-5 in the final. He has lost in the final the previous year to Shaun Wilkes.

Career finals

Pro-am finals: 2 (1 title)

Amateur finals: 2 (1 title)

References

English snooker players
Sportspeople from Merseyside
1969 births
Living people